The Life Clock is a concept by Bertrand Planes that is marked in sevens up to eighty-four, with a mechanism slowed down 61,320 times.  Each number represents a year, and a full rotation is made each 84 years (12x7=84). This was the maximum average lifespan in Europe in 2006. The numbers on a Life clock are 7, 14, 21, 28, 35, 42, 49, 56, 63, 70, 77, and 0.

Origin
The life clock was originally made by Bertrand Planes in 2004. The premise of the slowed-down mechanism was based on the average lifespan of Europeans, which is 81.5 years. The life clock was first shown at "Maison: Temoins", Paris in 2004.

External links
  Life Clock Page
   Life Clock on Internet 

Individual clocks